For writing communication, Identification is a key term for the discussion of rhetoric in Kenneth Burke′s A Rhetoric of Motives. Burke himself states that "identification" is more important for the work than persuasion, traditionally associated with rhetoric.

Burke suggests that whenever someone attempts to persuade, identification occurs: one party must "identify" with another. That is, the one who becomes persuaded sees that one party is like another in some way. His concept of identification works not only in relation to the self (e.g. that tree has arms and is like me, thus I identify with that tree), but also refers to exterior identification (e.g. that man eats beef patties like that group, thus he is identified with that beef-patty-eating group). One can perceive identification between objects that are not the self.

Summary argument of A Rhetoric of Motives

The book opens with an analysis of John Milton's Samson Agonistes and Matthew Arnold's Empedocles on Etna; from his analysis, Burke eventually arrives at the term "identification", and uses it to reclaim elements of rhetoric that have fallen away, while also expanding on it to show how identification supplements traditional emphases on persuasion. He argues that it gives us insight into social cohesion.

Identification and the Realm of Rhetoric

In particular, the concept of identification can expand our vision of the realm of rhetoric as more than solely agonistic. To be sure, that is the way we have traditionally situated it: “Rhetoric,” writes Burke, “is par excellence the region of the Scramble, of insult and injury, bickering, squabbling, malice and the lie, cloaked malice and the subsidized lie. . . . We begin with an anecdote of killing (in Samson Agonistes and “Empedocles on Etna”), because invective, eristic, polemic, and logomachy are so pronounced an aspect of rhetoric” (19-20). But while impelled to acknowledge this nature, we can look for more from rhetoric, he argues:
 “We need never deny the presence of strife, enmity, factions, as a characteristic motive of rhetorical expression. We need not close our eyes to their almost tyranneous ubiquity in human relations; we can be on the alert always to see how such temptations to strife are implicit in the institutions that condition human relationships; yet we can at the same time always look beyond this order, to the principle of identification in general, a terministic choice justified by the facts that the identifications in the order of love are also characteristic of rhetorical expression.” (20)

Facets of Identification

What is identification? Burke spends most of the rest of Section I of A Rhetoric of Motives exploring the concept, at the same time hammering out the realm of rhetoric.

Identification and Consubstantiality

In identifying with the interests of another (or being persuaded that shared interests exist, even if they do not), one is “substantially one” with that other, or consubstantial. At the same time, each individual can retain unique substance. Substance, a recurring Burkean theme, was examined in terms of its “universal paradoxes” in Grammar of Motives and in its manifestations as unique constructed acts in Symbolic of Motives; here, in the Rhetoric, substance is examined in its implications of division. To “identify with” is to become consubstantial, but, at the same time, as the Rhetoric shows us, “to begin with ‘identification’ is, by the same token, though roundabout, to confront the implications of division” (22).

It is in this key discussion of identification, consubstantiality, and division that Burke lays out his crucial definition of the realm of rhetoric:
 “Insofar as the individual is involved in conflict with other individuals or groups, the study of this same individual would fall under the head of Rhetoric. . . . The Rhetoric must lead us through the Scramble, the Wrangle of the Market Place, the flurries and flare-ups of the Human Barnyard, the Give and Take, the wavering line of pressure and counterpressure, the Logomachy, the onus of ownership, the War of Nerves, the War.” (23)

Identification and Property

In metaphysics, “a thing is identified by its properties” (23), but a rhetorical identification by property refers to material, economic property. Identification by material property is ethical, Burke states, but it is also the source of turmoil and discord when identifications establishing themselves through property come into relation with one another. The importance of property and the simultaneous, overlapping cooperation and conflict it entails make property and identification a key rhetorical topic, Burke says: “Put identification and division ambiguously together, so that you cannot know for certain just where one ends and the other begins, and you have the characteristic invitation to rhetoric. . . . The wavering line between the two cannot be ‘scientifically’ identified; rival rhetoricians can draw it at different places, and their persuasiveness varies with the resources each has at hand” (25).

In this section, Burke also notes the way identification functions as a screen, placing the term again firmly within the realm of rhetoric. Using science as an example, Burke explains that “however ‘pure’ one’s motives may be actually, the impurities of identification lurking about the edges of such situations introduce a typical Rhetorical wrangle of the sort that can never be settled once and for all, but belongs in the field of moral controversy where men properly seek to ‘prove opposites’” (26).

Identification and Autonomy

Identification can also be seen as the way in which specialized activities occupy, rather than transcend or escape, larger contexts: “The fact that an activity is capable of reduction to intrinsic, autonomous principles does not argue that it is free from identification with other orders of motivation extrinsic to it. Such other orders are extrinsic to it, as considered from the standpoint of the specialized activity alone. However, they are not extrinsic to the field of moral action as such, considered from the standpoint of human activity in general. . . . ‘Identification is a word for the autonomous activity’s place in this wider context.” (27)

Identification in this particular aspect is thus yet another major path into, or topic of, rhetoric; for example, “we are clearly in the region of rhetoric when considering the identifications whereby a specialized activity makes one a participant in some social or economic class. ‘Belonging’ in this sense is rhetorical.” (28) Such identification can become sinister when unacknowledged or hidden. Moreover, consubstantiality implies that sinister morality can spread through both substances, as when the morality associated with a so-called autonomous activity serves as the morality for the larger context with which it is identified: “One’s morality as a specialist cannot be allowed to do duty for one’s morality as a citizen. Insofar as the two roles are at odds, a specialty at the service of sinister interests will itself become sinister.” (31)

Identification and Cunning

Here Burke suggests expanding the realm of rhetoric to include the ways in which we operate rhetorically upon ourselves, forging identifications through unexamined or nonconscious motives, self-protective or suicidal. “If a social or occupational class is not too exacting in the scrutiny of identifications that flatter its interests, its very life is a profitable malingering (profitable at least until its inaccuracies catch up with it) — and as such, it is open to attack or analysis, Rhetoric comprising both the use of persuasive resources (rhetorica utens, as with the philippics of Demosthenes) and the study of them (rhetorica docens, as with Aristotle’s treatise on the ‘art’ of Rhetoric)” (36). The key element here that brings in cunning is consciousness, or perhaps more to the point, purposeful unconsciousness, or hypocrisy: “This aspect of identification, whereby one can protect an interest merely by not using terms incisive enough to criticize it properly, often brings rhetoric to the edge of cunning” (36).

See also
 Definition of man
 Identification in rhetoric

References

Rhetoric